Catherine Whistler is an Irish art historian and curator, specialising in Italian Renaissance and Baroque art. She is Keeper of Western Art at the Ashmolean Museum, a supernumerary fellow of St John's College, Oxford, and Professor of the History of European Art at the University of Oxford.

In 2018, Whistler was awarded the British Academy Medal for her book Venice and Drawing, 1500-1800: Theory, Practice and Collection; the Medal is awarded "for landmark academic achievement in any of the humanities and social science disciplines supported by the Academy".

Selected works

References

Living people
British art historians
Women art historians
Historians of the Renaissance
Fellows of St John's College, Oxford
People associated with the Ashmolean Museum
British women historians
Year of birth missing (living people)